The Scottish Tramway and Transport Society was founded on 27 June 1951. Until 1983 it was known as the Scottish Tramway Museum Society. The Society was originally formed by tramway enthusiasts, mainly living in the Glasgow area, with a view to preserve a Glasgow "Room and Kitchen" type single deck tramcar (which is now preserved in the city's Riverside Museum). The Society was less successful in attempting to preserve an Aberdeen tram. Tram 73 was Aberdeen's last double deck tram with an open upstairs balcony; it was stored for two years until lack of resources led to its scrapping in 1956.

The closure of Scotland's last tramway (Glasgow in 1962) led to the Society preserving several tramcars, including some in working order at the National Tramway Museum at Crich, near Matlock, Derbyshire. In 1963 the Society published the first edition of its magazine "Scottish Tramlines" which was later renamed "Scottish Transport" - covering all aspects of public transport in Scotland including tramway preservation. The Society has also published many other books of interest to transport enthusiasts, profits from which have largely been donated to the National Tramway Museum for the upkeep of its fleet of historic Scottish tramcars.

In the 1980s the Society started campaigning for the introduction of modern tram systems in Scotland. Since 2008 work on building a new tram line in Edinburgh has been underway and, following extensive delays and contractual disputes, opened 31 May 2014. The completion of this project is the fulfilment of one of the Society's major ambitions.

"Scottish Transport,"

The society's magazine, "Scottish Transport," has been published for over fifty years.  The current issue and back issues are available on  the societies' website 

Online Meetings

Since the 2020 pandemic society members and guests have met online via Google Meet. 
The link is https://meet.google.com/nkv-wfck-dci?authuser=0

Overseas Study Tours    Study tours outside the UK 

Tramcar Preservation

See also
Former major municipal tramways in Scotland:
Aberdeen Corporation Tramways (closed in 1958)
Dundee Corporation Tramways (closed in 1956)
Edinburgh Corporation Tramways (closed in 1956)
Glasgow Corporation Tramways (closed in 1962)
Museums:
Glasgow Museum of Transport (now Riverside Museum)
Summerlee Heritage Park
The Trolleybus Museum at Sandtoft
National Tramway Museum
Other links:
Glasgow Subway
Light Rail Transit Association
List of Tramways in Scotland
Proposals for new tram lines in Edinburgh
Strathclyde Partnership for Transport
Trams
Trams in Europe
Transport Scotland
Trolleybuses in Glasgow (1949–1967)

References

Scottish Transport magazine (2001 edition, no. 53), published by STTS, Glasgow, ISSN 0048-9808

External links
 Scottish Tramway and Transport Society

Light rail in the United Kingdom
Railway societies
Transport organisations based in Scotland
1951 establishments in Scotland
Tram transport in Scotland